Parasynegia is a genus of moths in the family Geometridae first described by Warren in 1893.

Species
Parasynegia pluristriaria (Walker, [1863]) India
Parasynegia diffusaria (Moore, [1868]) Bengal
Parasynegia macularia Warren, 1894 Sikkim
Parasynegia sundatriaria Holloway, 1993 Borneo, Sumatra
Parasynegia lineata (Warren, 1896) Java, Nias, Borneo
Parasynegia fortilineata Holloway, 1993 Borneo, Peninsular Malaysia (Perak)

References

Baptini